The Knockans is an Iron Age linear earthwork located in south-west Ireland, believed to be the site of the ancient Tailteann Games.

One of a number of Irish Iron Age linear earthworks, the Knockans is a double-banked monument partly destroyed by bulldozer in May 1997, which saw the northern bank totally destroyed and other material damage done.

See also 
 Black Pig's Dyke
 Dorsey, County Armagh
 Rathduff trench
 Magheracar earthwork

References 

 http://www.excavations.ie/report/1997/Meath/0002979/
 http://heritagecouncil.ie/unpublished_excavations/section8.html

Ancient dikes
Prehistoric sites in Ireland
Archaeological sites in County Meath
Linear earthworks